Girdhari Lal Yadav is a competitive sailor from Madhya Pradesh. He is a 2009 recipient of the Arjun Award.

He was awarded with Madhya Pradesh's highest sporting honor for coaches, Vishwamitra Award in December 2020 by Government of Madhya Pradesh.

References

Indian male sailors (sport)
Recipients of the Arjuna Award
Living people
Year of birth missing (living people)
Sportspeople from Madhya Pradesh